Chithramia is a genus of fungi of unknown placement within Ascomycota. It contains one species, Chithramia elegantissima.

References

External links 

 

Monotypic Ascomycota genera
Ascomycota enigmatic taxa